Wyoming Outlaw is a 1939 American "Three Mesquiteers" Western film directed by George Sherman and starring John Wayne, Ray Corrigan, and Raymond Hatton. Wayne played the lead in eight of the fifty-one films in the series.

Plot summary

Cast
 John Wayne as Stony Brooke
 Ray "Crash" Corrigan as Tucson Smith
 Raymond Hatton as Rusty Joslin
 Don 'Red' Barry as Will Parker
 Pamela Blake (as Adele Pearce) as Irene Parker
 LeRoy Mason as Joe Balsinger
 Charles Middleton as Luke Parker
 Katherine Kenworthy as Mrs. Parker
 Elmo Lincoln as U.S. Marshal Gregg
 Jack Ingram as Sheriff Nolan
 David Sharpe as Newt
 Jack Kenney as Amos Doyle
 Yakima Canutt as Henchman Ed Sims

See also
 John Wayne filmography

References

External links
 
 
 
 

1939 films
1939 Western (genre) films
American Western (genre) films
American black-and-white films
1930s English-language films
Three Mesquiteers films
Films directed by George Sherman
Republic Pictures films
Films set in Wyoming
Films scored by William Lava
1930s American films